is a former Japanese footballer who last played for Oita Trinita.

Career statistics
Updated to 2 February 2018.

1Includes J1 Promotion Playoffs and J2/J3 Promotion-Relegation Playoffs.

References

External links
Profile at Oita Trinita

1984 births
Living people
Waseda University alumni
Association football people from Tokyo
Japanese footballers
J1 League players
J2 League players
J3 League players
Shonan Bellmare players
V-Varen Nagasaki players
Oita Trinita players
Association football defenders